Rodrick Kabwe (born 30 November 1992) is a Zambian professional footballer who plays as a midfielder for South African Premier Division club Sekhukhune United and the Zambia national football team.

Career

Club
Kabwe began his career in Zambia with Kabwe Warriors in 2011, before subsequently moving to fellow Zambian Premier League team Zanaco three years later. During his time with Zanaco, he won the 2016 Zambian Premier League. On 22 December 2016, Kabwe signed for South African Premier Soccer League club Ajax Cape Town. He officially completed the move in January 2017.

Career statistics

Club
.

Honours

Club
Zanaco
 Zambian Premier League (1): 2016

References

1992 births
Living people
People from Ndola
Zambian footballers
Zambia international footballers
2015 Africa Cup of Nations players
Forest Rangers F.C. players
Kabwe Warriors F.C. players
Zanaco F.C. players
Cape Town Spurs F.C. players
Sekhukhune United F.C. players
Association football midfielders
Zambia Super League players
South African Premier Division players
National First Division players
Zambian expatriate footballers
Expatriate soccer players in South Africa
Zambian expatriate sportspeople in South Africa